Violin Sonata No. 2 may refer to:

 Violin Sonata No. 2 (Beethoven)
 Violin Sonata No. 2 (Brahms)
 Violin Sonata No. 2 (Enescu)
 Violin Sonata No. 2 (Fauré)
 Violin Sonata No. 2 (Grieg)
 Violin Sonata No. 2 (Hill)
 Violin Sonata No. 2 (Hindemith)
 Violin Sonata No. 2 by Charles Ives
 Violin Sonata No. 2 (Mozart)
 Violin Sonata No. 2 (Prokofiev)
 Violin Sonata No. 2 (Ravel)
 Violin Sonata No. 2 (Saint-Saëns)
 Violin Sonata No. 2 (Schumann)
 Violin Sonata No. 2 (Stanford)
 Violin Sonata No. 2 (Ysaÿe)